Botelloides sulcatus is a species of sea snail, a marine gastropod mollusk in the family Trochidae, the top snails.

Distribution
This marine species is endemic to Australia and occurs off South Australia, Tasmania and Western Australia; in the Arafura Sea.

References

 Ponder, W.F. 1985. A revision of the genus Botelloides (Mollusca: Gastropoda: Trochacea). Department of Mines and Energy, South Australia, Special Publication 5: 301-327 
 Wilson, B. 1993. Australian Marine Shells. Prosobranch Gastropods. Kallaroo, Western Australia : Odyssey Publishing Vol. 1 408 pp

External links
 To World Register of Marine Species

sulcatus
Gastropods of Australia
Gastropods described in 1944